Christophe Claro, better known as Claro (born 14 May 1962, in Paris), is a French writer and translator. He studied at the Lycée Lakanal in Sceaux, before working as a publishers' proofreader (1983–1986). He is one of the leading promoters of contemporary American literature in France. His translations in French include works by William T. Vollmann, Thomas Pynchon and Mark Z. Danielewski, amongst many others.

One of his novels, Electric Flesh (Chair électrique in French), was translated in English and published in the United States in 2006 (translation by Brian Evenson).

References

1962 births
Living people
Writers from Paris
Lycée Lakanal alumni
French male non-fiction writers